The Barnes Block is located in Eau Claire, Wisconsin.

History
For several years, the Chippewa Valley Bank was housed in the building. It also has connections with a number of local politicians, including Byron Buffington, who was the bank president, and Henry Laycock, who helped build it. Both men were members of the Wisconsin State Assembly.

The building was listed on the National Register of Historic Places in 1982 and on the State Register of Historic Places in 1989.

References

Bank buildings on the National Register of Historic Places in Wisconsin
National Register of Historic Places in Eau Claire County, Wisconsin
Buildings and structures in Eau Claire, Wisconsin
Richardsonian Romanesque architecture in Wisconsin
Brick buildings and structures
Commercial buildings completed in 1893